Hammamizade İsmail Dede Efendi (9 January 1778 – 29 November 1846) was a composer of Ottoman classical music.

Biography

He was born on 9 January 1778,  at Şehzadebaşı-Fatih in İstanbul. He started studying music with Mehmed Emin Efendi, at the age of eight. He attended rituals at Yenikapı Mevlevihanesi, a place of Mevlevi gathering. He studied with Ali Nutki Dede and learned to play ney, in Yenikapı Mevlevihanesi. He became "Dede" in 1799. Dede Efendi's music was well appreciated by Sultan Selim III and then he performed his works at the palace. He had composed hundreds of songs and mevlevi rituals. In 1846 he pilgrimaged to Mecca, but in Mina contracted cholera and died. His grave is now in Mecca.

His music
Dede Efendi gave lessons in Turkish music to Hamparsum Limonciyan who developed the Hamparsum notation, the dominant notation for Turkish music.

One of the greatest Turkish composers, he has created masterpieces in all forms and modes of Turkish music. He has also developed the composite musical modes of "sultanî yegâh", "nev-eser", "saba-buselik", "hicaz-buselik" and "araban kürdî". His greatest works are the seven Mevlevi pieces for Samah. More than two hundred of his compositions are available today.

His piece, Ey büt-i nev edâ olmuşum müptelâ, is featured as part of the theme for the Ottoman civilization in the expansion for the strategy game, Sid Meier's Civilization VI: Gathering Storm.

His museum
His house and music salon in the Istanbul neighborhood of Kumkapi has been preserved and is now a museum.

See also 
 Hafız Post
 Tanburi Cemil Bey
 Tanburi Büyük Osman Bey

External links 
  http://www.kultur.gov.tr

1778 births
1846 deaths
Composers from the Ottoman Empire
Composers of Ottoman classical music
Composers of Turkish makam music